Guokas is a surname.  Notable people with the surname include:

Al Guokas (1925–1990), American basketball player
Matt Guokas, Sr. (1915–1993), American basketball player and broadcaster, father of Matt
Matt Guokas (born 1944), American basketball player, coach, and broadcaster